Grenville David "Gren" Alabaster (born 10 December 1933) is a former New Zealand first-class cricketer who played for Otago, Canterbury and Northern Districts. A winner of the New Zealand Cricket Almanack Player of the Year Award in 1972, Alabaster was a right-arm off-break bowler. He toured with New Zealand on occasions, including the tour to Australia in 1973–74, but never in a Test match. His brother Jack Alabaster played 21 Tests.

Life and career
Gren Alabaster took 8/30 for Northern Districts against New Zealand Under-23s in March 1963. This established a new record for the side in first-class cricket, beating Don Clarke's 8/37 of just two months previously. Alabaster's mark stood for less than a year, until Maurice Langdon claimed 8/21 against Auckland in January 1964.

In a first-class career stretching from 1955–56 to 1975–76 he took 275 wickets at 23.24, and made 3200 runs at 23.88, with three centuries including a highest score of 108 for Otago against Central Districts at Wanganui in 1964–65. His most successful season with the ball was 1974–75; despite turning 41 during the season he took 34 wickets at 20.11 and helped Otago to victory in the Plunket Shield.

He also played 31 matches for Southland and Thames Valley in the Hawke Cup between 1961 and 1979. He captained Southland during their reign as title-holders between 1973 and 1977. When a Hawke Cup "team of the century" was selected to mark the centenary of the competition in 2011, he was named as the captain.

He became a New Zealand selector in the late 1980s and managed the New Zealand team on tours of Sri Lanka and Australia in 1987, and again in the 1990s.

Alabaster made his career in teaching, finishing as Principal of Waiau College in Tuatapere. He lives in retirement in Oxford in North Canterbury.

References

External links
 

1933 births
Living people
Otago cricketers
New Zealand cricketers
New Zealand cricket administrators
Northern Districts cricketers
Canterbury cricketers
South Island cricketers
New Zealand schoolteachers
Cricketers from Invercargill